Holopsamma is a genus of sponges belonging to the family Microcionidae.

The species of this genus are found in Australia and Central America.

Species:

Holopsamma arborea 
Holopsamma crassa 
Holopsamma elegans 
Holopsamma favus 
Holopsamma laminaefavosa 
Holopsamma macropora 
Holopsamma pluritoxa 
Holopsamma ramosa 
Holopsamma rotunda 
Holopsamma simplex

References

Poecilosclerida
Sponge genera